Thomas Burrell Wilson (December 12, 1852 in Hall, Ontario County, New York – January 11, 1929 in Hall, Ontario Co., NY) was an American politician from New York.

Life
He attended the district schools and Canandaigua Academy. Then he worked on the family farm. In 1878, he married Margaret Ann Scoon, and they had three children. He was Supervisor of the Town of Seneca for seven terms, and Chairman of the Board of Supervisors of Ontario County for two terms.

Wilson was a member of the New York State Assembly (Ontario Co.) in 1911 and 1912; and was Chairman of the Committee on Agriculture in 1912.

He was a member of the New York State Senate (42nd D.) from 1913 to 1916, sitting in the 136th, 137th, 138th and 139th New York State Legislatures.

He was also a Trustee of Cornell University from 1909 until his death in 1929.

Sources
 Official New York from Cleveland to Hughes by Charles Elliott Fitch (Hurd Publishing Co., New York and Buffalo, 1911, Vol. IV; pg. 360)
 THOMAS B. WILSON, 76.; Ex-State Senator and Agricultural Leader Dies at Hall, N.Y. in NYT on January 12, 1929
 Obit transcribed from the Proceedings of the 74th Annual Meeting of the New York State Horticultural Society (1929, pg 240f)

1852 births
1929 deaths
Republican Party New York (state) state senators
People from Ontario County, New York
Republican Party members of the New York State Assembly
Town supervisors in New York (state)